Comfort of Strangers is English singer-songwriter Beth Orton's fourth studio album, the follow-up to 2002's Daybreaker. The album was recorded in just two weeks at New York's Sear Sound studio in the spring of 2005, with musician and composer Jim O'Rourke as producer. It features Orton on guitar, piano and harmonica with O'Rourke on bass, piano and marimba and the American percussionist Tim Barnes on drums.

Singles
"Conceived", released 29 November 2005 as a digital download, and 31 January 2006 on 7" and CD in the UK.

Track listing
All songs were composed by Beth Orton; the title track was written in partnership with O'Rourke and singer-songwriter M. Ward.
"Worms" – 2:04
"Countenance" – 2:23
"Heartland Truckstop" – 2:48
"Rectify" – 2:27
"Comfort of Strangers" – 3:18
"Shadow of a Doubt" – 3:58
"Conceived" – 3:27
"Absinthe" – 4:02
"A Place Aside" – 2:19
"Safe in Your Arms" – 4:28
"Shopping Trolley" – 2:51
"Feral Children" – 3:35
"Heart of Soul" – 3:50
"Pieces of Sky" – 3:09

Limited edition bonus disc
"What We Begin"  – 3:30
"On My Way Home"  – 3:08
"Comfort of Strangers #9"  – 3:16
"Did Somebody Make a Fool of You?"  – 2:16
"Northern Sky"  – 2:58

Charts

References

2006 albums
Beth Orton albums
Astralwerks albums
EMI Records albums
Albums produced by Jim O'Rourke (musician)